The 1928 Texas Longhorns football team represented the University of Texas at Austin in the 1928 college football season. It was the second year under coach Clyde Littlefield, who led the team to their third Southwest Conference title.

1928 was also the first year in which Texas wore their now distinctive "burnt orange" jerseys.

Schedule

References

Texas
Texas Longhorns football seasons
Southwest Conference football champion seasons
Texas Longhorns football